Sugerman is a surname. Notable people with the surname include:

 Andrew Sugerman, American film producer
 Bernard Sugerman (1904–1976), Australian barrister, legal scholar, and judge
 Danny Sugerman (1954–2005), manager of the Los Angeles-based rock band the Doors

See also
 Sugarman, surname